Nilavarai is a location in the Jaffna District, Sri Lanka. It is popular for a natural underground Water well (Called Nilavari Bottomless well) where the water never gets depleted and it serves the irrigation of the neighbouring fields. There is another natural Water well in the Jaffna District by the name Idikundu (Idi-kun-du).

See also

Casuarina Beach 
Keerimalai
Kantharodai
Nallur (Jaffna)
Naguleswaram temple
Nallur Kandaswamy Kovil
Nainativu
Neduntheevu
Idikundu

References 

Villages in Jaffna District
Valikamam East DS Division